Anne Briggs is a folk album released in 1971 by Anne Briggs. The songs are Traditional apart from two Briggs originals, "Go Your Way" and "Living By The Water". The front cover photograph was taken by Pat Delap on Little Bealings Heath, Suffolk either in 1969 or 1970.

Release history 
In 2009, "Blackwater Side" was included in Topic Records 70 year anniversary boxed set Three Score and Ten as track four of the second CD in the set.

On Record Store Day 2015 Topic records re-released the album on 180g vinyl.

Track listing 
All tracks are traditional; arranged by Anne Briggs; except where noted.
"Blackwater Side" - 3:53
"The Snow It Melts The Soonest" - 2:23
"Willie O'Winsbury" - 5:31
"Go Your Way" (Anne Briggs, Bert Jansch) - 4:14
"Thorneymoor Woods" - 3:36
"The Cuckoo" - 3:11
"Reynardine" - 3:01
"Young Tambling" - 10:44
"Living By The Water" (Anne Briggs) - 3:55
"Ma Bonny Lad" - 1:17

Personnel
Anne Briggs - vocals, guitar, bouzouki 
Johnny Moynihan - bouzouki on "Willie O'Winsbury"
Technical
Sean Davies - recording
Humphrey Weightman - sleeve design
Patrick Delap - photography

References

1971 albums
Anne Briggs albums
Topic Records albums